My Pain and Sadness is More Sad and Painful Than Yours is the first studio album by Welsh rock band mclusky. It was initially released on Fuzzbox in 2000 and re-released by Too Pure in 2003. Andy Falkous is recorded as saying that the album started out as a collection of demos, which were later turned into album form. The album was predated by two singles, "Joy" and "Rice is Nice".

Track listing
 "Joy" – 1:11
 "Friends Stoning Friends" – 4:21
 "Whiteliberalonwhiteliberalaction" – 2:58
 "Rice is Nice" – 1:06
 "Flysmoke" – 3:36
 "Rock vs. Single Parents" – 3:07
 "She Come in Pieces" – 1:52
 "(Sometimes) I Have to Concentrate" – 2:56
 "When They Come Tell Them No" – 1:16
 "You Are My Sun" – 2:59
 "Rods on Crutches" – 2:31
 "Problems Posing as Solutions" – 3:49
 "mi-o-mai" – 0:58
 "Medium is the Message" – 2:51
 "World Cup Drumming" – 3:13
 "Evil Frankie" (hidden track) – 2:35

Personnel
 Mat Harding – drums
 Andrew Falkous – guitar, vocals
 Jon Chapple – bass, vocals

All songs written by Falkous/Chapple/Harding.

 John and Ian – recording
 James Bernard – mastering
 Sleeve layout – Absolute Design
 Zincsplash – management

Production credits are oddly absent in the liner notes of the album.

References

Mclusky albums
2000 albums
Too Pure albums